Harmologa oblongana is a species of moth of the family Tortricidae. It is found in New Zealand.

The forewings are ochreous whitish, suffused with brownish ochreous and fuscous grey along the margins. The costa and inner margin are strigulated (finely streaked) with dark fuscous and there is a distinct dark fuscous-grey basal patch, often mixed with ochreous. The hindwings are whitish grey, tinged with ochreous and spotted with dark grey. The apex is dark grey.

References

Moths described in 1863
Archipini
Endemic fauna of New Zealand
Moths of New Zealand
Endemic moths of New Zealand